Mathias De Witte (born 29 March 1993 in Bruges) is a Belgian cyclist, who currently rides for UCI Continental team .

Major results
2017
 6th Tro-Bro Léon
 6th Flèche Ardennaise
 10th Nokere Koerse
2018
 7th Ronde van Zeeland

References

External links

1993 births
Living people
Belgian male cyclists
Sportspeople from Bruges
Cyclists from West Flanders